This is a list of species in Odontomyia, a genus of soldier flies in the family Stratiomyidae.

Odontomyia species

Odontomyia adusta Loew, 1857
Odontomyia aequalis (Walker, 1861)
Odontomyia africana (Lindner, 1943)
Odontomyia albigenata (Lindner, 1935)
Odontomyia albomaculata Macquart, 1838
Odontomyia aldrichi Johnson, 1895
Odontomyia alini Lindner, 1955
Odontomyia alolena (Séguy, 1930)
Odontomyia altifrons Wulp, 1888
Odontomyia americana Day, 1882
Odontomyia amyris Walker, 1849
Odontomyia anchorata Bigot, 1879
Odontomyia angulata (Panzer, 1798)
Odontomyia angusta Walker, 1854
Odontomyia angustilimbata Brunetti, 1923
Odontomyia annulata (Meigen, 1822)
Odontomyia annulipes Macquart, 1850
Odontomyia araneifera Schiner, 1868
Odontomyia arcuata Loew, 1872
Odontomyia argentata (Fabricius, 1794)
Odontomyia aterrima Walker, 1856
Odontomyia atraria (Walker, 1865)
Odontomyia atrodorsalis James, 1941
Odontomyia atrovirens Bigot, 1879
Odontomyia aurata Meijere, 1911
Odontomyia aureovestis (James, 1948)
Odontomyia aureovittata Curran, 1928
Odontomyia australensis Schiner, 1868
Odontomyia azurea Becker, 1909
Odontomyia bahamensis (James, 1953)
Odontomyia barbata (Lindner, 1940)
Odontomyia bekily Woodley, 2001
Odontomyia bermudensis Johnson, 1914
Odontomyia bifascia (Walker, 1861)
Odontomyia bimaculata Yang, 1995
Odontomyia bipunctata Bigot, 1859
Odontomyia bipunctifacies (Lindner, 1951)
Odontomyia blastulaefrons (Lindner, 1939)
Odontomyia boharti (James, 1948)
Odontomyia borealis James, 1936
Odontomyia brodiei (Cockerell, 1915)
Odontomyia bulbifrons (James, 1950)
Odontomyia calva Lindner, 1972
Odontomyia carinata Macquart, 1846
Odontomyia carinifacies Macquart, 1850
Odontomyia carinifacies var. grandimaculata Hardy, 1920
Odontomyia carnifacies var. minima Hardy, 1920
Odontomyia carnifex (Gerstaecker, 1857)
Odontomyia chathamensis Hutton, 1901
Odontomyia chloris (Walker, 1854)
Odontomyia chrysaner (James, 1948)
Odontomyia cincta Olivier, 1811
Odontomyia cinctilinea (Walker, 1861)
Odontomyia clarifrons Lindner, 1972
Odontomyia claripennis Thomson, 1869
Odontomyia cohaerens Brunetti, 1923
Odontomyia colei James, 1936
Odontomyia collarti (Lindner, 1938)
Odontomyia collina Hutton, 1901
Odontomyia confertissima (Walker, 1858)
Odontomyia confusa (Rossi, 1794)
Odontomyia consobrina Macquart, 1848
Odontomyia coreana (Pleske, 1928)
Odontomyia cuthbertsoni (Lindner, 1937)
Odontomyia cyanea Brunetti, 1920
Odontomyia damascena Villeneuve, 1912
Odontomyia decipiens (Guerin-Meneville, 1838)
Odontomyia disciclara (Séguy, 1929)
Odontomyia discolor Loew, 1846
Odontomyia discolorata James, 1936
Odontomyia disparina (Lindner, 1935)
Odontomyia elisabethae Lindner, 1966
Odontomyia emarginata Macquart, 1838
Odontomyia evansi (James, 1957)
Odontomyia excocta Walker, 1851
Odontomyia exigua (Lindner, 1937)
Odontomyia fangchengensis Yang, Gao & An, 2004
Odontomyia fasciata Macquart, 1834
Odontomyia fascipes Brunetti, 1923
Odontomyia fastuosa (Bigot, 1884)
Odontomyia fiebrigi (Lindner, 1976)
Odontomyia filipjewi (Pleske, 1928)
Odontomyia finalis (Walker, 1859) 
Odontomyia flava Day, 1882
Odontomyia flavissima (Rossi, 1790)
Odontomyia foveifrons Thomson, 1869
Odontomyia frontalis Macquart, 1838
Odontomyia fulminans Bezzi, 1928
Odontomyia fulviceps (Walker, 1854)
Odontomyia gagathina Bezzi, 1928
Odontomyia garatas Walker, 1849
Odontomyia guianae (Lindner, 1949)
Odontomyia guizhouensis Yang, 1995
Odontomyia halophila Wang, Perng & Ueng, 2007
Odontomyia halophila Wang, Perng & Ueng, 2007
Odontomyia herbacea Lindner, 1966
Odontomyia herichsonii Hope, 1847
Odontomyia heterogastra Bezzi, 1928
Odontomyia hirayamae Matsumura, 1916
Odontomyia hirtocculata James, 1936
Odontomyia hoodiana Bigot, 1887
Odontomyia hunteri (MacLeay, 1826)
Odontomyia hydroleon (Linnaeus, 1758)
Odontomyia hydroleonoides Johnson, 1895
Odontomyia ialemus Walker, 1849
Odontomyia icae (Lindner, 1941)
Odontomyia idahoensis James, 1932
Odontomyia immiscens (Walker, 1859)
Odontomyia inaequalis Loew, 1866
Odontomyia inanimis (Walker, 1857)
Odontomyia interrupta Olivier, 1811
Odontomyia jamesi Lindner, 1968
Odontomyia kamande Woodley, 2001
Odontomyia kashmirensis Brunetti, 1920
Odontomyia kirchneri Jaennicke, 1867
Odontomyia kiricenkoi (Pleske, 1922)
Odontomyia lamborni (Lindner, 1937)
Odontomyia lateremaculata Macquart, 1850
Odontomyia limae Guerin, 1831
Odontomyia limbata (Meigen & Wiedemann, 1822)
Odontomyia limbata var. cephalonica Strobl, 1898
Odontomyia limbifacies Bigot, 1859
Odontomyia lineata Meijere, 1913
Odontomyia longicornis Lindner, 1966
Odontomyia lutatius Walker, 1849
Odontomyia luteiceps Meijere, 1911
Odontomyia maculata Meijere, 1907
Odontomyia magnificus Lachaise & Lindner, 1973
Odontomyia marginella Macquart, 1850
Odontomyia masaica (Lindner, 1953)
Odontomyia megacephala Olivier, 1811
Odontomyia microcera (Séguy, 1930)
Odontomyia microleon (Linnaeus, 1758)
Odontomyia microstoma Loew, 1866
Odontomyia mutica Wulp, 1885
Odontomyia neodorsalis Miller, 1950
Odontomyia nexura (Walker, 1858)
Odontomyia nigerrima Loew, 1872
Odontomyia nigrinervis Bezzi, 1926
Odontomyia nitidiceps Wulp, 1888
Odontomyia nitidissima (James, 1950)
Odontomyia notatifrons Brunetti, 1923
Odontomyia novaecaledoniae (Lindner, 1937)
Odontomyia novaeguineensis (Lindner, 1957)
Odontomyia nyassica (Lindner, 1943)
Odontomyia obscuripes Thomson, 1869
Odontomyia ochropa Thomson, 1869
Odontomyia okinawae Nagatomi, 1977
Odontomyia opertanea White, 1916
Odontomyia ophrydifera (Lindner, 1935)
Odontomyia ornata (Meigen, 1822)
Odontomyia pachycephala Schiner, 1868
Odontomyia pachyceps Bigot, 1879
Odontomyia painteri James, 1936
Odontomyia pallida Hill, 1919
Odontomyia parallela (Walker, 1865)
Odontomyia parallelina Bezzi, 1928
Odontomyia pauliani James, 1975
Odontomyia pectoralis Thomson, 1869
Odontomyia periscelis Loew, 1873
Odontomyia peruviana Macquart, 1855
Odontomyia picea Walker, 1851
Odontomyia picta (Pleske, 1922)>
Odontomyia pictifrons Loew, 1854
Odontomyia pilimana Loew, 1866
Odontomyia pilosus Day, 1882
Odontomyia plebeja Loew, 1872
Odontomyia poecilopoda Bezzi, 1906
Odontomyia polycedes (Speiser, 1910)
Odontomyia proba (Lindner, 1957)
Odontomyia profuscata Steyskal, 1938
Odontomyia pubescens Day, 1882
Odontomyia pulcherrima Brunetti, 1920
Odontomyia quadrata (Lindner, 1937)
Odontomyia quadrinotata Loew, 1857
Odontomyia rectifasciata Macquart, 1838
Odontomyia regisgeorgii Macquart, 1838
Odontomyia restricta (Walker, 1864)
Odontomyia rhodaspis James, 1980
Odontomyia rufifacies Macquart, 1850
Odontomyia rufipes Loew, 1866
Odontomyia rufiventris (Lindner, 1966)
Odontomyia rufocera Woodley, 2001
Odontomyia rufoscutellata Brunetti, 1926
Odontomyia saphyrina Lindner, 1968
Odontomyia schoutedeni (Lindner, 1938)
Odontomyia scutellata Macquart, 1846
Odontomyia seyrigi Lindner, 1968
Odontomyia shikokuana (Nagatomi, 1977)
Odontomyia siderogaster (Wiedemann, 1824)
Odontomyia sidneyensis Schiner, 1868
Odontomyia simplex (Bigot, 1887)
Odontomyia sinica Yang, 1995
Odontomyia smaragdifera (Lindner, 1938)
Odontomyia solennis Walker, 1851
Odontomyia stigmaticalis Thomson, 1869
Odontomyia stricta Erichson, 1842
Odontomyia stylata Macquart, 1847
Odontomyia subdentata Macquart, 1850
Odontomyia subobscura (James, 1948)
Odontomyia subpicta (James, 1957)
Odontomyia thula Woodley, 2001
Odontomyia tigrina (Fabricius, 1775)
Odontomyia timorensis (Lindner, 1951)
Odontomyia toxopeusi (Lindner, 1957)
Odontomyia transversa Brunetti, 1920
Odontomyia triangulifera Becker, 1913
Odontomyia tumida Banks, 1926
Odontomyia uninigra Yang, 1995
Odontomyia vanderwulpiana Brèthes, 1907
Odontomyia vicina Macquart, 1838
Odontomyia virgo (Wiedemann, 1830)
Odontomyia viridana (Wiedemann, 1824)
Odontomyia vittata Macquart, 1850
Odontomyia xanthopus Bezzi, 1906
Odontomyia yangi Yang, 1995

References

Odontomyia